Monkey nut may refer to:

Plants
Anacardium humile,  a plant species known for its medicinal and insecticidal properties
Hicksbeachia pinnatifolia, a small tree also known as beef nut, ivory silky oak, monkey nut, red bopple nut, red nut, and rose nut 
Peanut, a legume crop also known as a goober, groundnut, or monkey nut
Sterculia quadrifida, a small tree also known as the peanut tree or red-fruited kurrajong

See also
Monkey gland (disambiguation)